Hagahai, also known as Pinai, is one of two languages of the Piawi family of New Guinea. 

Speakers in Enga Province use the name Pinai for all Pinai-Hagahai speakers. Those in Madang use Hagahai, at least for themselves. Exonyms include Wapi and Miamia in Enga and Aramo in Haruai. 

Dialects are divergent, but speakers have a common identity.

Writing system

References

External links 
 Kaipuleohone has an archive of Pinai-Hagahai audio recordings

Piawi languages
Languages of Papua New Guinea